Life & Rhymes is the seventh studio album by Irish singer-songwriter Gilbert O'Sullivan, released in October 1982.

The album was produced by Graham Gouldman of 10cc and featured several musicians of various 10cc lineups: Paul Burgess, Vic Emerson and Duncan Mackay.

Union Square Music re-released it in August 2012 on the Salvo label as part of the Gilbert O'Sullivan – A Singer & His Songs collection.

Track listing
All songs written by Gilbert O'Sullivan.
 "Live Now Pay Later" – 3:03
 "Bear With Me" – 3:22
 "You Don't Own Me" – 3:38
 "A Minute of Your Time" – 3:40
 "Is It a Crime?" – 2:54
 "Got To Be That Way" – 3:15
 "Has Been" – 2:51
 "I Promise Honest" – 3:25
 "Wonder Why" – 3:15
 "Looking (A Tale of Two Meanings)" – 3:16
 "If I Know You" – 4:06
 "At Least I'm Honest" – 3:09

Bonus tracks on the 2012 remaster
 "Don't Bother At All" (b-side of "Bear With Me") – 3:26
 "In Other Words" (b-side of "A Minute of Your Time") – 3:33

Personnel
 Gilbert O'Sullivan – vocals, piano, electric piano, synth
 Graham Gouldman – all guitars, bass, backing vocals, percussion
 Paul Burgess – drums, percussion
 Vic Emerson – electric piano, synth
 Pete Wingfield – electric piano, synth, melodica
 Tessa Webb – backing vocals
 Bim Sinclair – synth, organ
 Bud Sinclair – percussion
 Duncan Mackay – organ
 Lenny – sax
 Orchestra arranged and conducted by Richard Niles

Sources
 Life & Rhymes, CD booklet, 2012

External links
Official Gilbert O'Sullivan page

1982 albums
Gilbert O'Sullivan albums
Albums produced by Graham Gouldman
CBS Records albums